Pick Me Up! is a British weekly women's magazine that is published through the Future plc group.

It "leapt" into the ten most popular weekly women's magazines in just six months, selling more than half a million copies.

Editor
June Smith-Sheppard was appointed editor of Pick Me Up for its launch in 2005. The Guardian referred to her as an "uncompromisingly ordinary launch editor, [that] offers a tantalising glimpse of the tongue-in-cheek items she hopes will define the new women's weekly.

Columnists
Jeremy Kyle: Jeremy wrote an agony uncle column for Pick Me Up, until September 2010, in the style of the talk show he presents, The Jeremy Kyle Show. He offers straight-talking advice to readers that need it.
Claire Petulengro: Claire offers a complete weekly horoscope in every issue and makes daily updates on the Pick Me Up website.
Dr Nicola Davies: Nicola is the investigative psychologist for the 'Making of a monster' column. This studies the psychological influences causing specific people to become notorious killers.
• GP Doctor Gary Bartlett is a regular contributor to writing the Instant Appointment column.

Reception
Pick Me Up! Magazine is cited as one of the magazines targeted by the campaign group "Curb The Chat Mags".

References

External links
Article about the magazine in The Guardian
Another article in The Guardian
Detailed 50 page Pick Me Up magazine audit at maglab.org.uk.

2005 establishments in the United Kingdom
2020 disestablishments in the United Kingdom
Women's magazines published in the United Kingdom
Weekly magazines published in the United Kingdom
Magazines established in 2005
Magazines disestablished in 2020
Magazines published in London